
Gmina Przeciszów is a rural gmina (administrative district) in Oświęcim County, Lesser Poland Voivodeship, in southern Poland.

Villages
The gmina contains the villages of Piotrowice, Podlesie and Przeciszów.

Neighbouring gminas
Gmina Przeciszów is bordered by the gminas of Babice, Oświęcim, Polanka Wielka, Wieprz and Zator.

References
Polish official population figures 2006

Przeciszow
Oświęcim County